Delroy Leslie (born on February 27, 1970) is a retired boxer from Jamaica, who competed for his native country at the 1992 Summer Olympics in Barcelona, Spain. Leslie competed in the Men's Lightweight (– 60 kg) division and was defeated in the first round by Japan's Shigeyuki Dobashi on points (5:11).

He has a daughter, Rayanna Leslie.

References

External links 
 
 
 

1970 births
Living people
Lightweight boxers
Boxers at the 1991 Pan American Games
Boxers at the 1992 Summer Olympics
Olympic boxers of Jamaica
Jamaican male boxers
Pan American Games bronze medalists for Jamaica
Pan American Games medalists in boxing
Central American and Caribbean Games silver medalists for Jamaica
Competitors at the 1990 Central American and Caribbean Games
Central American and Caribbean Games medalists in boxing
Medalists at the 1991 Pan American Games
20th-century Jamaican people
21st-century Jamaican people